Gates County Courthouse is a historic courthouse building located at Gatesville, Gates County, North Carolina.  It was built in 1836, and is a two-story, "T"-shaped, seven bay, Federal style brick building.  It has a three bay central projecting entrance pavilion and a delicate cast-iron second floor balcony added in 1904.

It was listed on the National Register of Historic Places in 1976.

References

County courthouses in North Carolina
Courthouses on the National Register of Historic Places in North Carolina
Federal architecture in North Carolina
Government buildings completed in 1836
Buildings and structures in Gates County, North Carolina
National Register of Historic Places in Gates County, North Carolina